Don Juan Antonio de Urrutia y Arana Perez de Inoriza y Chávarri was a rich and powerful nobleman and patron of the arts in 18th-century Querétaro, in the Viceroyalty of New Spain (Colonial Mexico).

He built and paid from his own money the Aqueduct to bring water from the springs in "La Cañada" (the Ravine) to the city of Querétaro, which includes the 74-arch aqueduct, now a landmark. He is considered the main benefactor of the town.

In 1756, Urrutia directed the construction of La Casa de la Marquesa, (House of the Marchioness), a beautiful home for his wife. The mansion, a colonial architectural landmark, is now a luxury hotel and  tourist attraction.

See also

List of Basques
Urrutia — surname.

Mexican people of Basque descent
18th-century Mexican people
18th-century Spanish people
Marquesses of Spain
Mexican nobility
People from Querétaro
Year of birth unknown
Year of death unknown